Mary Mason is a British singer who scored a minor hit in the UK Singles Chart in 1977 with a medley of Chip Taylor's "Angel of the Morning" / "Any Way That You Want Me", reaching #27 and spending six weeks in the chart. Earlier in the year, Mason took part in the A Song for Europe contest, with the song "What Do You Say to Love?". The song finished in second place, behind Lynsey de Paul and Mike Moran's "Rock Bottom". The television broadcast for the show was blacked out, which disappointed Mason as she told the press she had been relying on making a visual impact. She recorded for the Epic label in the UK.

References

Year of birth missing (living people)
Living people
Epic Records artists
Mason, Mary